Lee Orloff is an American sound engineer. He won an Academy Award for Best Sound and has been nominated for six more in the same category. He has worked on over 60 films since 1984.

Selected filmography
Orloff won an Academy Award for Best Sound and has been nominated for another six:

Won
 Terminator 2: Judgment Day (1991)

Nominated
 The Abyss (1989)
 Geronimo: An American Legend (1993)
 The Insider (1999)
 The Patriot (2000)
 Pirates of the Caribbean: The Curse of the Black Pearl (2003)
 Pirates of the Caribbean: Dead Man's Chest (2006)

References

External links

Place of birth missing (living people)
Year of birth missing (living people)
Living people
American audio engineers
Best Sound Mixing Academy Award winners
Best Sound BAFTA Award winners